Lieutenant-General Pierre Derksen Steyn (born 25 November 1942) is a retired South African Air Force officer who served as Secretary for Defence from 1994 to 1998, and as Chief of Defence Force Staff from 1990 to 1993. He is also known as the chair of the Steyn Commission, which from 1992 to 1993 investigated allegations of criminal and third force activity by the apartheid-era South African Defence Force.

Biography 
Steyn joined the South African Air Force (SAAF) of the South African Defence Force (SADF) in 1960, and in 1963 graduated from the military academy at Stellenbosch University with a BMil. He also has an MBL from Unisa (1990) and an LLB from Unisa (2011). He served as SAAF Chief of Operations from 1987 to 1988, as SADF Chief of Staff Personnel from 1989 to 1990, and as Chief of Defence Force Staff from 1990 to 1993. In 1992, President F. W. de Klerk appointed him to chair a commission of inquiry, best known as the Steyn Commission, into possible criminal activity among SADF units. He retired from the military in October 1993, several months after the submission of the Commission's final report.

Arms Deal 
In August 1994, Steyn was appointed the inaugural Secretary for Defence, a new civilian position at the head of the Department of Defence. He resigned in August 1998. He has said that he resigned because of financial management and procurement irregularities relating to the Arms Deal, which was signed in 1999 after his departure. He testified about the deal at the Arms Procurement Commission in May 2014, and was highly critical of the conduct of former Defence Minister Joe Modise and former SADF Chief of Acquisition Shamin "Chippy" Shaik.

Steyn Commission 

Amid the precarious negotiations to end apartheid, the early 1990s in South Africa were marked by political violence, commonly alleged by the African National Congress to be attributable to a state-aligned "third force." In this context, the Goldstone Commission, in the course of its inquiry into political violence, conducted a raid on the SADF Directorate of Covert Collections. When it found evidence of possible SADF involvement in illegal activities, Steyn was appointed, on 18 November 1992, to investigate. Steyn has said that he was constantly surveilled and harassed during the period in which the Commission operated.

The Night of the Generals 
In December 1992, in what is sometimes known as "the Night of the Generals," de Klerk met with Steyn and, the next day, announced that 23 SADF members had been compelled to retire or suspended pending further investigation. In Steyn's account, he had presented a situation report on his investigation to de Klerk, but had not recommended any specific actions or dismissals; instead, de Klerk had decided on the dismissals following consultation with SADF leadership.

Further reports and aftermath 
Steyn submitted several further reports to de Klerk before the Commission closed in July 1993. Some of the matters raised by Steyn were referred back to the Goldstone Commission or were taken up by the Truth and Reconciliation Commission.

A criminal investigation was conducted into implicated SADF officers, at Steyn's recommendation. According to SADF Chief Georg Meiring, the investigation was initiated in January 1993 under the Attorneys-General of the Transvaal and Witswatersrand, but was unable to substantiate Steyn's allegations. Ultimately, Wouter Basson, one of the generals suspended in December 1992, was the only SADF official to face criminal charges for activities investigated by the Steyn Commission. Indeed, Steyn had noted in his first report that his suspicions would be difficult to prove conclusively, especially due to the destruction of records and other evidence by SADF officials.

Findings 
The report of the Commission was partly leaked in 1997, but only declassified in 2006. According to the Mail and Guardian, President Nelson Mandela had decided that its findings were so "explosive" that their publication might threaten the stability of the post-apartheid transition. The report shows that the Commission found prima facie, but primarily under-corroborated, indication that SADF members had been involved in:

 Extra-judicial killings, including by poison
 Chemical attacks
 Weapons stockpiling in Portugal, elsewhere in Africa, and domestically
 Corruption
 Train violence and hostel violence
 Provision of military training to insurgents in neighbouring countries and to Inkatha
 Third force activity through "Project Pastoor"

Among the SADF units implicated in such activities were the 7 Medical Battalion; Special Forces; and Military Intelligence and its Directorate of Covert Collection. Some projects were allegedly undertaken in collaboration with the police or Civil Cooperation Bureau.

Awards and decorations 

 
 
 
 
 
 
 
 
 
  SAAF Pilot's Wings (more than 2500 hours)

References

Further reading 

 "Executive summary of the Steyn Report" (1992). Historical Papers Research Archive, Wits University.

South African Air Force generals
1942 births
Living people
People from Swellendam